Menace may refer to:

Arts and entertainment

Film and television
 The Menace (1928 film), an Australian silent film
 The Menace (1932 film), an American crime drama
 The Menace (1961 film)
 Menace (1934 American film)
 Menace (1934 British film), directed by Adrian Brunel and starring Victor Varconi
 La Menace, a 1977 French-Canadian film
 Menace (TV series), starring Michael Gothard
 "Menace" (Stargate SG-1), a season-five episode of the television series Stargate SG-1
 "Menace", a season-seven episode of the television series Law & Order

Other
 Menace (Marvel Comics), a foe of Spider-Man
 Menace (Atlas Comics), a 1950s science-fiction/horror comic-book series
 The Menace, the main villain of the first 12 books of the Goosebumps Horrorland children's novella series
 Menace (video game), a 1988 horizontal scrolling shooter game
 The Menace (album), by English alternative rock group Elastica
 Schumacher Menace, a radio-controlled car made by Schumacher Racing Products

Sports teams
 Des Moines Menace, an American soccer team
 New Mexico Menace, an Independent Women's Football League team in the 2008 and 2009 seasons, based in Albuquerque, New Mexico
 Steel City Menace, a short-lived American Indoor Football team that played part of the 2016 season

Other uses
 Menace (Greek settlement), an ancient Greek settlement to the southeast of Spain, according to Strabo
 Operation Menace or Battle of Dakar, an unsuccessful World War II Allied operation
 "The Menace", a nickname of Dennis Priestley (born 1950), English former professional darts player
 The Menace (newspaper), an anti-Catholic weekly newspaper published in Aurora, Missouri, from 1911 to 1920
 The menace reflex, a form of blink reflex
 MENACE, a short name for the Matchbox Educable Noughts and Crosses Engine.
 A threat

See also
 Master Menace, a Marvel Comics character
  Madame Menace, a persona of Sunset Bain, a Marvel Comics character
 Menaces, a legal term in the UK
 Menacing, a criminal offense in many US states